Arthur Schlossmann (16 December 1867 – 5 June 1932, in Düsseldorf) was a German pediatrician and social public health specialist.

Born in Breslau, Schlossmann attended the Kreuzschule in Dresden from 1874 to 1886. He obtained his doctorate from the University of Munich in 1891 after completing his medical studies at several German universities. As a young man he worked as an assistant at Adolf Aron Baginsky's Kaiser-und-Kaiserin-Kinderkrankenhaus in Berlin.

In 1897 at Dresden, he founded a private Säuglingsheim (home for babies), a hospital devoted entirely for in-patient treatment of sick infants. This institution was considered to be the first of its kind anywhere. Here, Schlossmann worked at improving care for infants, that included an environment adhering to strict asepsis, systematic training of pediatric nurses and testing that involved his personal ideas on natural diet.

In 1898, he received his habilitation at the Institut für Physiologische Chemie in the Technischen Hochschule at Dresden. Beginning in 1906 he worked in Düsseldorf, initially as director of the children's ward at the municipal hospital. In 1923 he attained the title of professor of pediatrics in Düsseldorf.

Selected writings 
 Handbuch der Kinderheilkunde (five volumes, 1906) with Meinhard von Pfaundler (1872-1947), this work was later translated into English as "The Diseases of children; a work for the practising physician".
 Handbuch der sozialen Hygiene und Gesundheitsfürsorge (six volumes, 1925–27) with Adolf Gottstein (1857–1941) and Ludwig Teleky (1872–1957).

References 
 World Cat Identities (list of publications)

German pediatricians
Physicians from Wrocław
Ludwig Maximilian University of Munich alumni
1867 births
1932 deaths
People educated at the Kreuzschule
People from the Province of Silesia